Channel 40 refers to several television stations:

Canada
The following television stations operate on virtual channel 40 in Canada:
 CHOT-DT in Gatineau, Quebec
 CIVK-DT-2 in Percé, Quebec
 CJMT-DT in Toronto, Ontario

Mexico
The following television station operates on virtual channel 40 in Mexico:
 XHTVM-TDT in Mexico City

See also
 Channel 40 virtual TV stations in the United States
For UHF frequencies covering 627.25-631.75 MHz:
 Channel 40 TV stations in Canada
 Channel 40 TV stations in Mexico
 Channel 40 digital TV stations in the United States
 Channel 40 low-power TV stations in the United States

40